Leptophobia aripa, the common green-eyed white or mountain white, is a butterfly in the family Pieridae. It is native to Mexico, Central America and South America, but strays may be found as far north as southern Texas.

It is a multivoltine species with overlapping generations. Adults feed on flower nectar of various species, including Emilia sonchifolia, Lantana camara and Bidens pilosa.

The larvae feed on Brassicaceae species, including Brassica oleracea. Other records include Nasturtium officinale, Tovaria pendula and Tropaeolum moritzianum.

Subspecies
The following subspecies are recognised:
Leptophobia aripa aripa (Venezuela, Ecuador)
Leptophobia aripa balidia (Boisduval, 1836) (Brazil)
Leptophobia aripa elodia (Boisduval, 1836) (Mexico, Bolivia, Ecuador)
Leptophobia aripa elodina (Röber, 1908) (Bolivia, Argentina)

References

Pierini
Butterflies described in 1836
Fauna of Brazil
Pieridae of South America
Taxa named by Jean Baptiste Boisduval